Frank Miller (March 5, 1912 – January 6, 1986, Skokie, Illinois) was a principal cellist and music director whose professional career spanned over a half-century.  

Miller studied at the Curtis Institute of Music, under Felix Salmond, and at age 18, joined the Philadelphia Orchestra.  His longest stints were principal cellist of the NBC Symphony Orchestra and the Chicago Symphony Orchestra, and conductor of the Evanston Symphony Orchestra. A 1950 segment of Miller playing cello in "The Swan" from Carnival of the Animals with an orchestra on The Voice of Firestone is sometimes shown on Classic Arts Showcase.

Career
 1930–1935: At age 18, Miller joined the Philadelphia Orchestra, under conductor Leopold Stokowski.
 1935–1939: He joined the Minneapolis Symphony as principal cellist under conductor Eugene Ormandy, also acting as associate conductor.
 1939–1954 He was the principal cellist of the NBC Symphony Orchestra, under conductor Arturo Toscanini.
 1957–1959: Casals Festival Orchestra in Puerto Rico, under Pablo Casals 
 1959–1985: He was the principal cellist of the Chicago Symphony Orchestra.
 1962-1984: He served as the music director of the Evanston Symphony Orchestra.
 1964: He co-founded the Savoyaires, a group dedicated to performing Gilbert and Sullivan operettas on Chicago's North Shore, with writer Lilias Circle.

He also taught at DePauw University in Chicago.

References

External links
 [ All Music: Frank Miller: Overview]

American classical cellists
1912 births
1986 deaths
Curtis Institute of Music alumni
20th-century classical musicians
20th-century American musicians
20th-century cellists